Mam is a 2010 British short film by writer Vivienne Harvey and director Hugo Speer. Produced by Vigo Films in association with South Yorkshire Filmmakers Network. It has a running time of 15 minutes.

Plot summary 
When Mam won’t get out of bed, 12-year-old Danny must fend for his brothers and sisters - whilst trying to protect a secret that threatens to break up the family forever.

Cast 
 Josie Lawrence as Reenie
 Paul Barber as The Chemist
 Ronan Carter as Danny
 Tisha Merry as Charlie
 Karren Winchester as The Neighbour
 Charlie Street as Jimmy
 Katie Gannon as Lauren
 Patrick Downes as Tommy
 Sylvie Caswell as Kyla
 Elly May Taylor as Debs
 Jodie McEnery as Gang Member
 James Varley as Gang Member
 Dwayne Scantlebury as Gang Member
 Danny Gregory as Gang Member
 Paul Tomblin as Gang Member

Accolades 
 Best Foreign Film - Williamsburg Independent Film Festival, Brooklyn, USA (2011)
 Best Yorkshire Short - Hull International Short Film Festival, UK (2011)
 Best Community Short - Rob Knox Film Festival, UK (2012)

Festivals

External links 
 
 BFI
 British Film Council
 Screen Yorkshire
 The Moving Arts Journal - Review 

2010 films
British short films
British independent films
2010s English-language films
2010s British films